Reaching for the Moon is a 1930 American pre-Code black and white musical film. Originally released at 91 minutes; surviving versions are usually cut to 62 minutes. A 74-minute version aired in 1998 on AMC. The DVD version runs just under 72 minutes. The film's working title was Lucky Break and is known as Para alcanzar la Luna in Spain. It is not to be confused with the Fairbanks silent film Reaching for the Moon (1917).

Background
The film was originally intended to be a musical with songs written by Irving Berlin but problems soon developed. From the start, Berlin found Edmund Goulding, the director, difficult to work with. Also by mid-1930 the studio realized that the public's demand for musicals had disappeared. So Goulding jettisoned many of Berlin's songs from the score. Although just five Berlin songs had been recorded, the film, even in its scaled-down form, proved very expensive to make. By the time the filming was complete, the costs had come to about a million dollars, a huge budget for the times, and one that virtually ruled out the possibility of the film returning a profit.

The one song that was retained was "When the Folks High Up Do the Mean Low Down" introduced by Bing Crosby who had filmed it late at night after completing his work at the Cocoanut Grove.
Variety commented on this song specifically, saying: "None of the Berlin songs is left other than a chorus of hot numbers apparently named "Lower Than Lowdown" [sic]. Tune suddenly breaks into the running in the ship's bar when Bing Crosby, of the Whiteman Rhythm Boys, gives it a strong start for just a chorus which, in turn, is ably picked up by Miss Daniels, also for merely a chorus, and then in an exterior shot to the deck where June MacCloy sends the lyric and melody for a gallop of half a chorus.

Plot
Wall Street wizard, Larry Day, new to the ways of love, is coached by his valet. He follows Vivian Benton on an ocean liner, where cocktails, laced with a "love potion", work their magic. He then loses his fortune in the market crash and feels he has also lost his girl.

Cast
Douglas Fairbanks as Larry Day
Bebe Daniels as Vivien Benton
Edward Everett Horton as Roger
Claud Allister as Sir Horace Partington Chelmsford
Jack Mulhall as Jimmy Carrington
Walter Walker as James Benton
June MacCloy as Kitty
Helen Jerome Eddy as Larry's Secretary
Bing Crosby as Bing
Larry Steers as Flier (uncredited)

Soundtrack
"When the Folks High-Up Do the Mean Low-Down"
Written by Irving Berlin
Sung by Bing Crosby, Bebe Daniels, June MacCloy and chorus.
"Reaching for the Moon"
Written by Irving Berlin
(heard instrumentally over the opening credits, as background music for a love scene, then briefly at the end)

References

External links

Alternate period lobby poster

1930 films
1930 musical films
American musical films
1930s English-language films
Films scored by Alfred Newman
Films directed by Edmund Goulding
Films produced by Joseph M. Schenck
United Artists films
American black-and-white films
Films set on ships
1930s American films